The 2011–12 Four Hills Tournament was held at the four traditional venues of Oberstdorf, Garmisch-Partenkirchen, Innsbruck and Bischofshofen, located in Germany and Austria, between 28 December 2011 and 6 January 2012.

Overall standings
The final standings after the four events. Gregor Schlierenzauer was the overall winner.

Oberstdorf
 HS 137 Schattenbergschanze, Germany
30 December 2011

Garmisch-Partenkirchen
 HS 137 Große Olympiaschanze, Germany
1 January 2012

Innsbruck
 HS 130 Bergiselschanze, Austria
4 January 2012

Bischofshofen
 HS 140 Paul-Ausserleitner-Schanze, Austria
6 January 2012 

Only one round was held due to bad weather.

See also 
 2011–12 FIS Ski Jumping World Cup

References

External links 
 Official website 

Four Hills Tournament
Four Hills Tournament, 2011-12
Four Hills Tournament, 2011-12
2011 in German sport
2012 in German sport
2012 in Austrian sport